Kruglyshevo is a rural locality (a village) in Krasnoplamenskoye Rural Settlement, Alexandrovsky District, Vladimir Oblast, Russia. The population was 19 as of 2010. There is 1 street.

Geography 
Kruglyshevo is located on the Rassolovka, 33 km northwest of Alexandrov (the district's administrative centre) by road. Mukhanovo is the nearest rural locality.

References 

Rural localities in Alexandrovsky District, Vladimir Oblast